Odocoileus is a genus of medium-sized deer (family Cervidae) containing three species native to the Americas. The name is sometimes spelled odocoeleus; it is from a contraction of the roots odonto- and coelus meaning "hollow-tooth".

Extant species

References 

 
Capreolinae
Mammal genera
Taxa named by Constantine Samuel Rafinesque
Pleistocene mammals of South America